S. frontalis may refer to:
 Scatophagus frontalis, a fossil fish species
 Sericornis frontalis, the white-browed scrubwren, a passerine bird found in coastal areas of Australia
 Serinus frontalis, the western citril, a species of finch found in Burundi and the Democratic Republic of Congo
 Silvicultrix frontalis, the crowned chat-tyrant, a species of tyrant flycatcher found in Bolivia and Colombia
 Sitta frontalis, the velvet-fronted nuthatch, a small passerine bird found in southern Asia from Pakistan, India and Sri Lanka
 Sporophila frontalis, the Buffy-fronted seedeater, a species of bird found in Argentina and Brazil
 Sporopipes frontalis, the speckle-fronted weaver, a species of bird found in Benin and Burkina Faso
 Stenella frontalis, the Atlantic spotted dolphin, a dolphin found in the Gulf Stream of the North Atlantic Ocean
 Synallaxis frontalis, the sooty-fronted spinetail, a species of bird found in Argentina and Bolivia

See also
 Frontalis (disambiguation)